The Place of Honeymoons is a 1920 silent American film written by Ida Harrison and directed by Kenean Buel. It stars Emily Stevens, Montagu Love, Frankie Mann and Joseph Selman.

Cast list

Production
The production was filmed in Newton, Massachusetts at the Atlas Film Company studios. While ready for release earlier in the year, it was not distributed until November 1920 by Pioneer Films.

Reception
Moving Picture World did not give the film a good review. They felt the film's pace was slow and rambling, and the relationship between the two leads, Emily Stevens and Montagu Love, was never well developed. While they enjoyed Love's performance, the felt that Stevens was miscast and not carry off her role well.

References

Films directed by Kenean Buel
American silent films
American black-and-white films